Vasumitra was a Buddhist monk of the Sarvastivada school who flourished in the 2nd century CE. A native of Gandhāra, he presided over the 4th Buddhist council in Kashmir, administered by Kanishka I. He is credited as contributing to the Mahāvibhāṣā.

Contribution
Vasumitra put forward a thesis to defend the tenet of the Sarvastivada school that dharmas exist in the past and future as well as the present. According to this argument, dharmas exist in a noumenal or latent state in the future until they attain a moment of causal efficacy (karitra) in the present. This marks their entry into a functional relationship with other phenomena. When this moment is past, they reenter into a noumenal state that is understood as "past." 
Vasumitra's theory of temporality was accepted in preference to the views posited by other monks such as Dharmatrāta, Ghoṣa, and Buddhadeva.

Ancestor
Vasumitra is the eighth zen ancestor. According to Soto Zen tradition, Vasumitra "always wore clean clothing. He used to wander around the villages carrying a wine vessel, whistling and singing. People thought he was crazy."

References

2nd-century philosophers
Indian scholars of Buddhism
Mahayana Buddhists
Zen patriarchs
Buddhist logic
Indian logicians
Indian Buddhist monks